is a retired Nippon Professional Baseball player. He played for the Yakult Swallows in 1999.

External links

Living people
1972 births
Baseball people from Akita Prefecture
Japanese baseball players
Nippon Professional Baseball catchers
Yakult Swallows players
Yomiuri Giants players